Hong Jeong-ho (or  ; born 12 August 1989) is a South Korean footballer who plays for Jeonbuk Hyundai Motors as a centre-back. His brother Hong Jeong-nam is also a footballer.

Club career
On 1 September 2013, Hong Jeong-ho transferred to FC Augsburg from Jeju United for a fee estimated around €2 million. He signed a four-year contract which will keep him at the club until 2017.

Implication in 2011 match-fixing scandal
During the 2011 K-League season, Hong was accused of being involved in the 2011 South Korean football betting scandal and was held out of a league match during the investigation. Although the investigation discovered that gangs had deposited 4 million won unsolicited into Hong's bank account, he had later returned the funds and was cleared of wrongdoing. Subsequently, Hong was declared eligible for league and national team matches.

Career statistics

International goals
Scores and results list South Korea's goal tally first, score column indicates score after each Hong goal.

Honors

Club
Jeju United
 K League 1 Runners up: 2010

Jeonbuk Hyundai Motors
 K League 1 Winners (4): 2018, 2019, 2020, 2021
 KFA Cup Winner: 2020

Individual
 K League 1 Best XI (4): 2010, 2019, 2020, 2021
 K League 1 Most Valuable Player: 2021

References

External links
 
 
 
 Hong Jeong-ho – KFA Cup Stats at KFA  
 
 Hong Jeong-ho at fcaugsburg.de
 
 

1989 births
Living people
Association football defenders
South Korean Roman Catholics
South Korean footballers
South Korea under-20 international footballers
South Korea under-23 international footballers
South Korea international footballers
South Korean expatriate footballers
Jeju United FC players
FC Augsburg players
Jiangsu F.C. players
K League 1 players
Bundesliga players
Chinese Super League players
Expatriate footballers in Germany
Expatriate footballers in China
South Korean expatriate sportspeople in Germany
South Korean expatriate sportspeople in China
2011 AFC Asian Cup players
2014 FIFA World Cup players
Asian Games medalists in football
Footballers at the 2010 Asian Games
Asian Games bronze medalists for South Korea
Medalists at the 2010 Asian Games
Sportspeople from Jeju Province